The Fifth Dimension of Sex (original title: A 5ª Dimensão do Sexo, A Quinta Dimensão Do Sexo) is a 1984 Brazilian exploitation film directed by Brazilian filmmaker José Mojica Marins. The film is one of several exploitation sex films that Marins made throughout the 1980s.

Plot
Two chemistry students, Paulo and Norberto are ridiculed by their classmates, as it is rumored that they are impotent. They work together to develop a formula that turns them into crazed sex maniacs, and begin kidnapping women on the streets and raping them. The series of sex crimes soon leads to a police chase, and the two men discover that they are in love with each other.

Cast
José Mojica Marins
Mário Lima
Débora Muniz
Marcio Prado
João Francisco

References

External links

A 5ª Dimensão do Sexo Official Coffin Joe webpage 
A 5ª Dimensão do Sexo View trailer on the Official website
A Quinta Dimensão Do Sexo Cinema Brasileiro 

1984 films
1980s Portuguese-language films
Brazilian LGBT-related films
Films directed by José Mojica Marins
Sexploitation films